East Somerset was the name of a parliamentary constituency in  Somerset, represented in the House of Commons of the Parliament of the United Kingdom between 1832 and 1918.

From 1832 to 1885, it returned two Members of Parliament (MPs), elected by the bloc vote system of election. From 1885 to 1918, a different constituency of the same name returned one MP, elected by the first past the post voting system.

Boundaries
1832–1868: The Hundreds or Liberties of Bath Forum, Bempstone, Brent and Wrington, Bruton, Catsash, Chew and Chewton, Norton Ferris, Frome, Glaston Twelve Hides, Hampton and Claverton, Horethorne, Keynsham, Kilmersdon, Mells and Leigh, Portbury, Wellow, Wells Forum, Whitstone, Winterstoke, and Witham Friary, and the parts of the Hundred of Hartcliffe with Bedminster excluded from the limits of the City of Bristol.

1885–1918: The Sessional Divisions of Somerton and Wincanton, and part of the Sessional Divisions of Shepton Mallet and Wells.

History

1832–1868
The constituency, formally called The Eastern Division of Somerset, was created for the 1832 general election, when the former Somerset constituency was divided into new East and West divisions. It also absorbed the voters from the abolished borough of Milborne Port. The constituency might have been better described as North-Eastern Somerset, since its limits stopped well short of the southern extremities of the county. It surrounded the cities of Bath and Wells (although both were boroughs electing MPs in their own right, freeholders within these boroughs who met the property-owning qualifications for the county franchise could vote in East Somerset as well, as could those in Frome); other towns in the division were Glastonbury, Burnham-on-Sea, Clevedon, Keynsham, Midsomer Norton, Portishead, Radstock, Shepton Mallet, Somerton and Weston-super-Mare.

1868–1885
The Second Reform Act brought about significant boundary changes, which came into effect at the 1868 general election, as Somerset was given a third county constituency. The southern end of East Somerset (including Glastonbury, Radstock, Shepton Mallet and Somerton as well as the area round Frome and Wells) was moved into the new Mid Somerset division. The revised East Somerset constituency was now defined as consisting of the Long Ashton, Axbridge, Keynsham, Temple Cloud and Weston Petty Sessional Divisions.

1885–1918
At the 1885 general election, there were further radical boundary changes, Somerset's three two-member county divisions together with one abolished borough being reorganised into seven single-member county constituencies. One of these took the name of Eastern Somerset, but this included none of the voters from the 1867-85 East Somerset constituency, who were divided between the new Frome, Northern Somerset and Wells divisions.

The new Eastern division was carved out of the previous Mid Somerset division, with Shepton Mallet being its largest town; it also included Somerton, Street and Wincanton. This was a predominantly rural constituency, though with some industry in the towns (notably brewing and bootmaking), and a strong Nonconformist religious tradition. It would probably have been a safe Liberal seat, but when its sitting Liberal MP joined the Liberal Unionists when the party split in 1886, he had no difficulty holding his seat until he retired.

Abolition
The constituency was abolished for the 1918 general election, when Somerset's number of county members was reduced by one. It was mostly replaced by the revised Wells county constituency, but the town of Somerton was transferred to Yeovil.

Members of Parliament

MPs 1832–1885 

Notes
1 Miles was created a Baronet in 1859.

MPs 1885–1918

Election results

Elections in the 1830s

Brigstock's death caused a by-election.

Elections in the 1840s

Gore-Langton's death caused a by-election.

Elections in the 1850s

Elections in the 1860s

Elections in the 1870s

Bright's death caused a by-election.

Allen resigned, causing a by-election.

Elections in the 1880s

Elections in the 1890s

Elections in the 1900s

Elections in the 1910s

General Election 1914–15:

Another General Election was required to take place before the end of 1915. The political parties had been making preparations for an election to take place and by July 1914, the following candidates had been selected; 
Unionist: Ernest Jardine
Liberal: John Thompson

References 

 The Constitutional Year Book for 1913 (London: National Union of Conservative and Unionist Associations, 1913)
F W S Craig, British Parliamentary Election Results 1832-1885 (2nd edition, Aldershot: Parliamentary Research Services, 1989)
 Michael Kinnear, The British Voter (London: BH Batsford, Ltd, 1968)
 Henry Pelling, Social Geography of British Elections 1885-1910 (London: Macmillan, 1967)
 Frederic A Youngs, jr, Guide to the Local Administrative Units of England, Vol I (London: Royal Historical Society, 1979)

Parliamentary constituencies in Somerset (historic)
Constituencies of the Parliament of the United Kingdom established in 1832
Constituencies of the Parliament of the United Kingdom disestablished in 1918